The Zeta Phi Society was a fraternal organization founded in 1870 at the University of Missouri. The Alpha chapter of the society became a chapter of Beta Theta Pi in 1890. The Missouri unit is the oldest fraternity in continuous existence at the University and the second fraternity founded west of the Mississippi River. Its second chapter, Sigma chapter joined Phi Gamma Delta in 1886. Zeta Phi Society's other two units disbanded.

The Zeta Phi Society

Early History
The driving force behind the creation of Zeta Phi (ΖΦ) was a young university professor named Oren Root II. The son of a university professor and the elder brother of statesman Elihu Root, Professor Root came to the University of Missouri in June 1866 to fill the chair of English Language and Literature. Root had been a member of Sigma Phi, an established eastern fraternity, during his younger days. It is probably no coincidence that Root's fledgling fraternity at Missouri University was given a name similar to that of his college fraternity. In fact, the new society's fraternity pin, adopted in December 1870, closely resembled a Sigma Phi pin, with the Greek letter zeta replacing the sigma superimposed over the letter phi. Some have speculated that Professor Root may have intended that Zeta Phi one day become a chapter of Sigma Phi. For whatever reason, however, the fraternity remained independent for two decades. Minutes from one of the early meetings of the Zeta Phi Society record discussions over whether the group should link up with an eastern fraternity. At the following meeting it was decided that the society would, instead, become the genesis for a western fraternity with the Missouri group as the mother chapter to the organization.

The first meeting of Zeta Phi was held in the Union Literary Hall at the University, (now known as Switzler Hall), and was attended by Root and eight students. Those in attendance included Frank M. Houts of Warrensburg, Jacob Linn Ladd of Mexico, Nelson Washington Allen of Allenton, Evans Perry McDonald of Wellington, George Bingham Rollins of Columbia, Robert Franklin Walker of Versailles, Lycurgus A. Marvin of Sedalia, Scott Hayes of Springfield, and Oren Root, Jr. Root initially was not a formal member of the society but was subsequently inducted and is listed as the twelfth name on the rolls of Zeta Phi. Five weeks after the first meeting on December 15, 1870, the society adopted a fraternity color - white, and the previously described badge as its fraternal regalia.

Although it was originally intended to be a literary society rather than a Greek-letter fraternity in the modern sense, the ideals of the organization carried many of the precepts of its modern-day counterpart. The first minutes of the society read as follows: "There having been some previous understanding with a few young men of the University that a meeting be held for the organization of a secret society, the object of which was to be a social and intellectual culture, as well as close intimacy through life..." The society's constitution soon took on these principles and added "the perpetuation of brotherly love" as the organization's reason for existence.

The society met for a time in a third floor room of the old Academic Hall (whose remaining columns now are the centerpiece of Francis Quadrangle), then in Switzler Hall, and finally in a second floor room in a downtown hall. Members adopted secret designations selected from the names of prominent figures in the literary or scientific world and these designations served as a member's chapter identification. Early minutes of the Zeta Phi Society include, for example, references to members known as Julius Caesar, Sir Isaac Newton, Copernicus and others.

Expansion
The members of Zeta Phi soon envisioned the creation of a regional fraternity beyond the bounds of Missouri University, and began the task of organizing additional chapters at nearby universities and colleges. On November 18, 1871, the Sigma chapter of Zeta Phi was chartered at William Jewell College in Liberty, Missouri, and on December 9, 1872, the Omicron of Zeta Phi was chartered at Washington University in St. Louis. There is some indication that a fourth chapter was planned in Kansas, but no details, other than approval of a charter in old society minutes, are given in surviving records.

The William Jewell chapter continued on, apparently somewhat robustly, for the next 15 years until it petitioned out of Zeta Phi to become a chapter of Phi Gamma Delta. The Washington University chapter, however, became extinct after only two years in large part because of opposition from members of the University's faculty.

However, the MU chapter continued to flourish and staved off banishment by the University by initiating members of the faculty. Social activities began to carry greater emphasis with the society and the minutes of the March 16, 1878 meeting mention a serenade of four young ladies. The chapter adopted the custom of wearing a badge of mourning upon the death of an alumnus but this appears to have been discontinued by the time Zeta Phi joined Beta Theta Pi. A pinning is also recorded and several young women were actually "initiated" into the group and given a small pin to wear. A number of distinguished townspeople, in addition to members of the faculty, were also initiated into the society.

The four known chapters of Zeta Phi were as follows. Those that merged are in bold, inactive chapters at the time of the merger are italicized:

In 1882, the Alpha chapter had only eight active members and had decreased markedly in both size and activity. By 1884, however, memberships had increased to twenty, and a ritual and initiation ceremony were described in the chapter minutes.

Zeta Phi received several invitations to unite with national fraternities before it finally became a chapter of Beta Theta Pi. Alpha Tau Omega approached the Zeta Phis on January 22, 1880 but was politely rebuffed. On April 24, 1884, the society was solicited by the Sigma Nu fraternity and flatly refused the offer, as the minutes of June 8, 1884 recorded: "the Alpha of Zeta Phi positively refuse to unite with Sigma Nu." The Kappa Alpha Order made an offer on January 6, 1886, without success, as did Phi Kappa Psi on May 17, 1886.

On June 4, 1885, a petition signed by eighteen active members of the Alpha of Zeta Phi was sent to the Beta Theta Pi fraternity, petitioning to unite with them. According to one source, this desire to join the Betas grew out of close relations with the Alpha Delta chapter of Beta Theta Pi at Westminster College. The petition was subsequently dropped, however, possibly out of concern for the William Jewell chapter or alumni pressure. When the Westminster Betas inquired some months later, the minutes of January 6, 1886 record Zeta Phi's reply: "We inform our committee man to report that we are not anxious to enter."

The Zeta Phi Chapter

Affiliation with Beta Theta Pi
No records are available from the period 1886 to 1890 but it appears that Alpha chapter of Zeta Phi reconsidered a union with Beta Theta Pi during this time, as a result of the withdrawal of their Sigma chapter at William Jewel College from the order. On , a motion carried in the Alpha of Zeta Phi to become a chapter of Beta Theta Pi pursuant to several special conditions. The petition was granted by the General Fraternity at its convention in the summer of 1890. As noted in the minutes, the conditions were as follows:

"That we be known as the Zeta Phi chapter of Beta Theta Pi."
"That all active members of this chapter be initiated, and that all alumni of this chapter be admitted into full membership of the Beta Theta Pi fraternity upon acknowledging allegiance to its constitution."
"That the active members of this chapter be the sole judges of the new men who shall be initiated into the chapter."

The changeover ceremony from a society to a chapter, and the initiation, when all alumni of the society and actives at the university were accepted as Betas, took place at Stone Hall. Following the ceremony, the group adjourned downstairs to what was known as O'Rear's Oyster Parlor for a banquet.

The Mizzou group apparently continued to meet on a regular basis in the Union Literary Building, now as a Beta chapter, and in 1895, began a fund toward the purchase of a chapter house. In 1901, the chapter rented accommodations and began living together for the first time in a two-story rental house at 201 South Ninth Street. The fund for a permanent house continued to grow, however, and in late 1904, only a few months after the formation of the Zeta Phi corporation, a spacious three-story frame house was completed at 714 Missouri Avenue at a cost of $9,000. The chapter lived in the house, one of the first of such permanent facilities on campus, from 1905 until 1912.

On New Year's Day of the latter year, however, tragedy struck when the building caught fire and burned to the ground. Within months, plans were made for the construction of a larger new house, this one to be built of brick and mortar. A fund drive was started and the monies raised, along with a substantial insurance recovery from the loss of the previous house, enabled the chapter to occupy new premises in 1913 with only a modest mortgage. The chapter's new address, 520 South College Avenue, occupied a site formerly owned by the Kappa Sigma fraternity and the new building with its gabled roof stood out within the Missouri Greek system.

In September 1917, the District Chiefs of the General Fraternity met with the trustees of Beta Theta Pi at the International Hotel in Niagara Falls, New York. Their purpose was to decide which chapter of the fraternity would be awarded the first Sisson Trophy. The initial award, which had been established only months before, was an honor to be bestowed on the top chapter in the general fraternity. After a full discussion of a number of chapters, the Chiefs made the following recommendations to the Board, which were recorded in the minutes:

"The District Chiefs have carefully considered the claims of the several chapters to the Sisson Trophy, to be awarded this year for the first time. They have noted with extreme gratification that, in spite of the disturbed conditions of the past year, several chapters have been considered worthy of this honor. It is the opinion of the Chiefs that the Sisson Trophy, which is to go to the chapter which most nearly approximates the ideal chapter of the fraternity, be awarded to the Missouri chapter, and we do so recommend."

The War Years
The first World War brought the chapter's progress to an abrupt halt. With the demand for manpower on both the war front and at home, most of the chapter's active members either entered the military or went to work on farms or in factories. The June 1918 edition of the Beta Theta Pi Magazine listed 62 Zeta Phis, both actives and alumni, enlisted in the military. Ten did not survive the war.

During the war, although a few members remained in school, the chapter house was occupied by the S.A.T.C. (Student Army Training Corps). Ironically, the War Department's newly implemented selective services system was administered by another Zeta Phi, General Enoch Crowder '86, in Washington, D.C.

The end of the war brought a prompt reorganization of the chapter, largely due to the efforts of Rogers Crittendon '19 and other concerned alumni. A journal describing chapter rules, ceremonies, officer functions and pledge training proved to be quite useful for the new crop of young men who joined the fraternity at the end of the war. Miss Elizabeth Ransom, the housemother since 1916, resumed her duties following the war.

The 1920s were a prosperous and rewarding time for the Zeta Phi chapter (at Mizzou) as its membership excelled both academically and in extra-curricular activities. The chapter had the highest grade average among all fraternities a number  of times during this decade and Brother Charles Parker '27 became the second Zeta Phi to win a Rhodes Scholarship.

World War II suspended much of the activity at the university and during the war years the chapter's size was again reduced considerably. By 1946, however, it was largely business as usual at 520 South College, and the late 1940s saw the chapter take up where it had left off.

Post-Wars
The 1950s boasted five of six Student Union presidents and a number of top athletes as well. To accommodate the expanding group, the annex at 1307 Willson Avenue was purchased in 1958 at a cost of $50,000.

The early 1960s saw continuing progress for the chapter, with high grades and back-to-back intramural titles in 1961, 1962, 1963, 1964, and 1965. The old house at 520 South College and an adjacent structure were torn down in 1963 to make way for a new house. A fund drive among alumni and friends raised nearly $200,000, without which the new facility would not have been possible. During the late 1960s, the "anti-war" movement and the "anti-establishment" sentiments that followed hurt the fraternity system at the university and elsewhere. As total Greek membership declined, many fraternities were forced to close their doors in the face of falling memberships and poor funding.

Zeta Phi chapter at Mizzou, however, weathered the period well and continued to dominate intramurals while maintaining a high academic stature. By the mid-1970s, fraternities again began to gain in popularity and the chapter rode the crest of this wave, winning the coveted "triple crown"—grades, intramurals, and singing competitions—roughly every other year.

Present day
Zeta Phi chapter <ref>As both surviving, but merged chapters are named Zeta Psi, the body text indicates which is being discussed by noting either "Mizzou or William Jewel.</ref> at Mizzou solidified its academic and intramural dynasty in the latter half of the 20th century. From the years 1959 to 1999 the Mizzou chapter placed first in the highest grade point average on campus every year but six, in which they placed second. Between 1974 and 2001 the fraternity won the intramural championship 24 times.

The 1980s saw a comeback for the fraternity system that has placed it in the vogue, especially at large midwestern universities such as the University of Missouri. In the 1990s the Zeta Phi chapter maintained its high position on campus, consistently finishing first among fraternities in grade point average and earning a long succession of Don Faurot intramural crowns. In 1993, the Yeckel Library was completed, which was made possible by a $100,000 gift from the widow of Philip J. Yeckel '33. In 2011 and 2012, the Zeta Phi chapter of Beta Theta Pi at the University of Missouri embarked on an aggressive capital campaign to raise $10 million for a new, state-of-the-art chapter house.

The new building was completed in 2012, and Zeta Phi chapter continues as a thriving Mizzou organization today. Its alumni association maintains a website reflective of its pride in the original regional fraternity for which the chapter is named.

Awards
Four men of the Zeta Phi chapter (Mizzou) have won the Rhodes Scholarship
John Reily Knox Chapter Excellence Award
Francis H. Sisson Award
Campus Involvement Award

Notable alumni of the Mizzou chapter

Business
 Shawn Askinosie '83, chocolate  maker and founder of Askinosie Chocolate
 Ralph W. Babb '71, Chairman and CEO, Comerica
 Thomas M. Begel '64, chairman & CEO, Pullman-Peabody Company
 William E. Cornelius '53, president & CEO, Union Electric Company
 Harry M. Cornell Jr. '50, president and CEO of Leggett & Platt
 Harold S. Hook '53, chairman, American General Corporation
 Kenneth Lay '64, former chairman and CEO of Enron
 Robert A. Maxwell '63, vice president, HBO
 William Morgan '63, founder of Kinder Morgan energy company
 Raymond F. O'Brien '48, chairman, Consolidated Freightways
 Dave Spence, CEO of Alpha Packaging and the 2012 Republican candidate for governor of Missouri
 Sam Walton '40, founder and chairman of  Wal-Mart

Education
 Thomas Swain Barclay '15, professor of political science at Stanford University
 Andrew W. McAlester, physician and Dean of the Medical School at the University of Missouri and namesake for McAlester Hall and Arboretum
 Col. Charles R. Stribling III '49, president, Missouri Military Academy (ret.)
 Timothy Wolfe '80, president of the University of Missouri System

Entertainment
 Steve Cash '68, musician in the Ozark Mountain Daredevils and composer of hits "Jackie Blue" and "If You Wanna Get to Heaven"
 Greg Cromer '93, actor
 Mike Fleming '73, member of the Grammy-winning bluegrass band The SteelDrivers
 Daniel Lindsay '01, Academy Award-winning documentary filmmaker
 Greg Warren '91, comedian

Government
 Matt Bartle '87, Missouri state politician
 William S. Cowherd 1881, former Democratic mayor of Kansas City, Missouri in 1892–1893 and member of the U.S. House of Representatives from Missouri in 1897–1905
 William B. Cravens 1893, former member of the U.S. House of Representatives from Missouri
 Thomas T. Crittenden, Jr. 1882, former mayor of Kansas City, Missouri from 1908 to 1909 
 Gen. Donald Dawson '32, former aide to President Truman, Curator of the Truman Presidential Library 
 M. Fowler Hamilton '31, Rhodes scholar and founder of Cleary Gottlieb Steen & Hamilton law firm. Also served as director of the Agency for International Development in the Justice Department during the Kennedy administration
 Darwin Hindman '55, mayor of Columbia, Missouri
 James P. Kem '10, U.S. Senator from Missouri, 1947 to 1953
 William E. Kemp, 1914, mayor of Kansas City, Missouri
 Peter D. Kinder '76, politician from Missouri
 Royce R. Lewellen, '52, California Superior Court Judge
 Stephen N. Limbaugh, Sr. '51, U.S. Federal District Court Judge and former president of the Missouri Bar Assoc.
 Guy B. Park 1896, governor of Missouri
 Bill Phelps '56, attorney and former Lieutenant governor of Missouri 
 Thomas L. Rubey 1885, former member of the U.S. House of Representatives from Missouri
 Kimbrough Stone 1895, judge of the U.S. Circuit Court of Appeals, Eighth Circuit
 Robert F. Walker 1891, attorney general of Missouri
 Charles Yeater 1880, former Governor-General of the Philippines

Humanitarianism/activism
 R. Crosby Kemper Jr. '50, philanthropist and businessman who transformed City Center Bank into United Missouri Bank in Kansas City and is the namesake of the Kemper Museum of Contemporary Art

Journalism
 Byron Calame '61, journalist and former editor of the Wall Street Journal and New York Times Thomas Franklin Fairfax Millard 1884, American journalist, newspaper editor, founder of the China Weekly Review, author on topics of the Far East and first American political adviser to the Chinese Republic; was also a war correspondent for the New York Herald'' during the Spanish–American War, the Boer War, the Boxer Uprising, the Russo-Japanese War and the Second Sino-Japanese War
 Edgar Snow '28, journalist renowned for his coverage of the Chinese Communist revolution

Military
 Floyd Bruce Cramer 1898, Spanish–American War veteran and namesake of Cramer Hall
 Gen. Enoch Crowder 1886, United States Military World War I general

Athletics
 Gary Barnett '69, former head football coach, Northwestern University and the University of Colorado
 Harry Ice, a record setting halfback for the University of Missouri Tigers football team
 Gus Otto '65, former NFL player for the Oakland Raiders
 Norm Stewart '56, basketball coach, University of Missouri (initiated as an alumnus)

References

Fraternities and sororities in the United States
Beta Theta Pi
University of Missouri
Student organizations established in 1870
1870 establishments in Missouri